The 1897 Amateur Hockey Association of Canada season was the eleventh season of play of the ice hockey league. Each team played 8 games, and Montreal Victorias were again first with a 7–1 record, retaining the Stanley Cup. The club won the Stanley Cup back from the Winnipeg Victorias prior to the season. This was their third-straight league championship.

League business

Executive 
 J.A. Findlay, Montreal (President)
 J. H. Dunbar, Quebec (1st. Vice-Pres.)
 Weldy Young, Ottawa (2nd. Vice-Pres.)

At the annual meeting on December 12, 1896, the secretary reported that the association had lost all of its records in a fire, except for its minutes.

Rule Changes 

 No more than a 15-minute delay during a game
 No raising the stick above the shoulder except for 'lifting.'
 Executives were given the power to suspend club or player for foul play.
 Protests of games had to be made within two days.

Season 

Clare McKerrow of Montreal HC set a new record with six goals in the opening game against Quebec on January 9.

The Ottawa club moved to new Dey's Arena.

Final standing

Stanley Cup challenge 

Prior to the season, Victorias would defeat the Winnipeg Victorias of the (Manitoba Hockey Association) 6–5, on December 30, 1896, to reclaim the Cup they had lost in the previous season to Winnipeg.

Victorias vs. Winnipeg at Winnipeg 
The Montreal Victorias submitted their challenge on November 11, 1896, and they arrived in Winnipeg on December 27 for the one-game playoff on December 30. The challenge, the first outside of Montreal attracted national interest. Excitement for the game in Winnipeg sent the price of $1 tickets to $5, with reports of tickets being sold for over $10. The Montreal Vics' practice in the McIntyre Rink itself drew a crowd of 700. The game was reported back to Montreal by telegraph, with the score available at train stations or telegraph offices throughout Canada. Hundreds of standing-room tickets were sold on the night of the game.

Game description
The game itself was very exciting. Ernie McLea scored a hat-trick, including the game and Stanley Cup winning goal. The game started at 8:22 pm local time. Dan Bain scored at 6:30 to put Winnipeg ahead. Winnipeg opened up a 3–0 lead before Montreal scored twice (McLea and Shirley Davidson) to close the gap while Toat Campbell served a penalty. Attie Howard scored just before the half to put Winnipeg ahead 4–2 at the half. In the second half, Montreal's Davidson scored his second goal, then McLea tied the score at four with his second goal of the match. Robert MacDougall, on an end-to-end rush, put Montreal ahead, but Bain tied it at five with four minutes to play. With two minutes to play, Graham Drinkwater passed to McLea, who beat George Merritt on a breakaway to put Montreal ahead 6–5 and win the game. The goal is considered one of the greatest ice hockey goals of all time.

Game summary

Referee – Weldy Young, Ottawa
Umpires – A. Shearer, Montreal; D. Clark, Winnipeg, Shaw, Ottawa

Source: Montreal Gazette

Exhibitions 
Montreal played the Halifax Wanderers in Halifax, Nova Scotia, on February 25, 1897. The Wanderers defeated Montreal 4–3 on a second-half goal after the teams were tied 3–3 at half-time.

Schedule and results 

† Protested by Ottawa who scored the tying goal in last few seconds but the goal was disallowed by the referee. The protest was upheld and the game replayed.

‡ Replay of January 30 protested game.

†† Victorias clinch league championship.

Player statistics

Goaltending averages 
Note: GP = Games played, GA = Goals against, SO = Shutouts, GAA = Goals against average

Scoring leaders

Stanley Cup engravings

1896 Montreal Victorias

1897 Montreal Victorias

See also 
 List of Stanley Cup champions
 List of pre-NHL seasons

References 
 
 
 
Notes

1897
AHAC